Pajsije of Janjevo (Janjevo, 1542? – Peć, 2 November 1647) was the Archbishop of Peć and Serbian Patriarch from 1614 to 1647, seated at the Patriarchal Monastery of Peć. He was also a writer, poet, composer, educator, and diplomat.

The greatest accomplishment of Serbian literature and theology happened under Patriarch Pajsije who inspired the revival of hagiographical literature and entered into theological debates with Pope Gregory XV and particularly with Pope Urban VIII concerning the question of the procession of the Holy Spirit. He patronized art on a grand scale. He funded works by woodcarvers of iconostasis and icon painters during his entire reign as patriarch from 1614 to 1648. His travels took him to Moscow in 1622, Constantinople in 1641, and Jerusalem in 1646.

He was born in Janjevo, at the time part of the Ottoman Empire, the son of a clergyman, Dimitrije. He was educated in his birth town where the wealthy folks of Janjevo had their own school which he attended regularly and continued his education at the seminary of Gračanica monastery. He was a pupil of Jovan Kantul. Early in life he showed that he was a great "book lover" and a very cultured man who took care to preserve manuscripts scattered about various monasteries. He himself was a writer. Patriarch Pajsije states in one of his works, "Service to Tsar Uroš" (Stefan Uroš V), he put in it "Troparion" and "Kontakion"—writing first the Sticheron of the small vespers .... "all in the order required by liturgy."

Metropolitan of Novo Brdo and Lipljan
Pajsije was elected Metropolitan of Novo Brdo and Lipljan in 1612. He was consecrated by Patriarch Jovan II Kantul and the Metropolitans of Sentence Synod on July 15, 1612. Today, there still exists one document in which he signed his name as "Humble Pajsije, Metropolitan of Novo Brdo." When Patriarch Jovan left for Constantinople in 1614, he appointed Pajsije as locum tenens. Patriarch Jovan was accused by the sultan's court for collaborating with the Holy Roman Empire and sentenced to death. This occurred four years prior to the Thirty Years' War.

Serbian Patriarch
When the news of Jovan's sentence arrived in Peć, Pajsije was elected patriarch on October 4, 1614. The new patriarch soon established relations with Tsardom of Russia. His name appeared in Russian state documents beginning in 1622 during the reign of Patriarch Philaret of Moscow and his son, Emperor Michael I of Russia. Pajsije often traveled. He visited the half-devastated Žiča Monastery in 1620 and began its repair. He visited Belgrade in 1632 and Šišatovac Monastery, which contains the relics of Saint Stefan Štiljanović on October 7, 1632. The patriarch, together with Jeftimije, Metropolitan of Niš and Leskovac, also visited Bishop Maxim Predojević of the Eparchy of Marča in Austro-Hungary (today's Croatia).

The militant policy of Patriarch Jovan ended with his mysterious death in Constantinople (Istanbul) but his successor, Pajsije adopted a more passive policy with both the Turk in Constantinople and the Pope in Rome. Pajsije I Janjevac realized that open rebellion could not set things right. Very early on he turned for aid to Tsardom of Russia which had for a while already been a source of literary (service books) and some financial support. As the head of the Church, he worked earnestly to strengthen the faltering spirit of the nation through constant celebration of Liturgy and by intense writing. He wrote the biography of the last Serbian emperor, Uroš, and composed a Service to him. In his "Life of Emperor Uroš", Pajsije sought to connect this ruler to the uninterrupted line of Serbian history. His work started with the Nemanjić ancestry and continued to own time, with Uroš's life representing only one episode. In the book, Pajsije himself reveals his larger ambition: It was my desire to understand and learn this: whence the Serbs originated, and for what purpose.

He also wrote the Service to St. Symon (Stefan the First-Crowned) and his successor, Gavrilo I (1648–1655) who, like Jovan Kantul, would die a martyr's death while in Turkish captivity in Bursa in 1659.

Pajsije's policy towards the Turks was compromising, and ever changing with every new sultan. He outlived five of them, (Ahmed I, Mustafa I, Osman II, Murad IV and Ibrahim of the Ottoman Empire). He also contemplated the question of union with the Roman church informing Pope Urban VIII about main obstacles separating Catholics and Orthodox faithful alike. In November 1642, a Roman Catholic emissary, Francesco Leonardi (missionary), arrived in Peć. In the pope's name, he tried to start negotiations towards union. Patriarch Pajsije, together with two bishops, discussed this with him. Pajsije was strongly against the filioque. He was ready to recognize the pope's primatum honoris, but only if the pope gave up the filioque, azyme, and other new teachings. This was stated in a synodical letter that was sent to Rome. At the time, the curia in Rome had a program of compulsory conversion to Catholicism that would transfer Serbs into Croats by first having them join the Uniate Church, like in Kiev. In 1640, the Vatican's Sacred Congregation for the Propaganda of the Faith (Congregation for the Evangelization of Peoples) sought to gain Mardarije Kornečanin of Montenegro and Patriarch Pajsije, to the church union. Mardarije was also in favour of placing Montenegro under Venetian suzerainty. But Pajsije's policy was far more prudent, balancing his nation's best interests between the East and the West. With a conciliatory policy, Pajsije managed to alleviate the hardship of slavery and promote the Serbian spiritual and national revival, constantly reminding his people of their glorious past and Serbian statehood. By his wise policy and correct relationship towards Serbian cultural inheritance, Patriarch Pajsije succeeded in creating an atmosphere which produced an unexpected enthusiasm for building and decorating temples. He did not forget Niš, as well. In 1647, in his last days of life, he noted in the book that he was always carrying with himself - "Peć Memorabilia: Dorotej, Niš". The question has still remained unanswered whether he visited Niš with the mentioned Dorotej or he may have sent his assistant Dorotej to Niš. Nevertheless, this is a valuable document and an important confirmation of the enlightened activities of Patriarch Pajsije in the area of Niš. His presence at Niš, as well as throughout the Serbian Patriarchate of Peć, contributed to the revival of cultural and religious life. His activities in the Niš region are reflected in the construction and restoration of Serbian churches and monasteries, as well as in the work of producing book, printing and publishing. In the seventeenth century, Patriarch Pajsije made great efforts to save older manuscripts, which he himself rebound and placed in safer monasteries or returned to their owners.

Patriarch Pajsije used his time in rebuilding and repairing churches, transliterating, and translating books. The church in Morača Monastery was painted in 1614 by Hilandar monks. Serbian noblemen rebuilt the Dobrilovina Monastery in 1614 and its church in Čukojevac. The patriarch was an avid book collector. Western diplomats who traveled to the Southeastern Europe bore witness that the Serbian Patriarchate of Peć was well-organized.

He canonized the last ruler from the Nemanjići dynasty, Emperor Stefan Uroš V. Patriarch Pajsije was forced to visit Constantinople in 1641 to obtain protection from local Turkish governors.

Death
Patriarch Pajsije was wounded by a bull in the village of Budosavci. He died a few days later on November 2, 1647, and was buried in Patriarchal Monastery of Peć.

Works
 Žitije cara Uroša (The Life of Emperor Uroš)
 Sluzba za poslednjeg Nemanjića (Service to Uroš, the Last of the Nemanjić)
 Sluzba prepodobnom Simeonu (Service to Simeon)
 Prološko žitije Simeonovo (The Life of Simeon)
 Biography of Stefan Štiljanović

References

Sources

 
 
  
 
 
 
 The question of the procession of the Holy Spirit (Jovanović 1992)

External links
 Official site of the Serbian Orthodox Church: Serbian Archbishops and Patriarchs
 

17th-century Serbian people
Patriarchs of the Serbian Orthodox Church
Serbian saints of the Eastern Orthodox Church
Kosovo Serbs
People from Lipljan
1647 deaths
Year of birth uncertain